Crotta d'Adda is a comune (municipality) in the Province of Cremona in the Italian region Lombardy, located about  southeast of Milan and about  west of Cremona.

Crotta d'Adda borders the following municipalities: Acquanegra Cremonese, Castelnuovo Bocca d'Adda, Cornovecchio, Grumello Cremonese ed Uniti, Maccastorna, Meleti, Monticelli d'Ongina, Pizzighettone, Spinadesco.

References

Cities and towns in Lombardy